Freddy Hernández Gómez (born 23 March 1979) is a Mexican professional boxer who challenged for the WBC welterweight title in 2010.

Professional career
Hernández beat Damian Frias (16-1) in a one-sided 10-round decision to win the WBC Latino welterweight title. On February 2, 2010 he knocked out DeMarcus Corley in the fifth round to defend his WBC Latino welterweight title.

Hernandez vs. Berto 
On November 27, 2010 Hernández lost against Andre Berto for the WBC welterweight title.

Hernandez vs. Angulo 
On August 27, 2016, Hernandez fought Alfredo Angulo. Hernandez won the fight via unanimous decision, 98-92, 97-93 and 97-93.

Hernandez vs. Bohachuk 
On May 19, 2019, Hernandez fought Serhii Bohachuk. Bohachuk was ranked #8 by the IBF and #13 by the WBC at super welterweight. Bohachuk defeated Hernandez via a fifth round knockout.

Professional boxing record

{|class="wikitable" style="text-align:center; font-size:95%"
|-
!Result
!Record
!Opponent
!Type
!Round, time
!Date
!Location
!Notes
|-align=center
|Loss || 34-11 ||align=left| Serhii Bohachuk
|KO || 5 (8) || May 19, 2019 || align=left| The Avalon, Hollywood, California, USA
|align=left|
|-align=center
|Loss || 34-10 ||align=left| Jason Quigley
|UD || 10 || October 15, 2018 || align=left| Fantasy Springs Casino, Indio, California, USA
|align=left|
|-align=center
|Loss || 34-9 ||align=left| Wale Omotoso
|UD || 10 || December 15, 2017 || align=left| Pioneer Event Center, Lancaster
|align=left|
|-align=center
|Win || 34-8 ||align=left| Alfredo Angulo
|UD || 10 || August 27, 2016 || align=left| Honda Center, Anaheim
|align=left|
|-align=center
|Win || 33-8 ||align=left| Todd Manuel
|MD || 8 || August 27, 2015 || align=left| The Hangar, Costa Mesa
|align=left|
|-align=center
|Win || 32-8 ||align=left| Jorge Juarez
|TKO || 1 (6), 2:51 || May 22, 2015 || align=left| Gimnasio De Mexicali, Mexicali, Baja California
|align=left|
|-align=center
|Win || 31-8 ||align=left| Jorge Juarez
|TKO || 2 (10), 2:23 || March 6, 2015 || align=left| Gimnasio De Mexicali, Mexicali, Baja California
|align=left|
|-align=center
|Loss || 30-8 ||align=left| Brad Solomon
|TKO || 6 (10), 1:36 || September 6, 2014 || align=left| Laredo Energy Arena, Laredo, Texas
|align=left|
|-align=center
|Loss || 30-7 ||align=left| Julian Williams
|KO || 3 (10), 0:35 || March 17, 2014 || align=left| House of Blues, Boston, Massachusetts
|align=left|
|-align=center
|Loss || 30-6 ||align=left| Francisco Santana
|UD || 10 || August 16, 2013 || align=left| Chumash Casino, Santa Ynez, California
|align=left|
|-align=center
|Loss || 30-5 ||align=left| Delvin Rodríguez
|TKO || 8 (10), 1:37 || May 24, 2013 || align=left| Mohegan Sun Casino, Uncasville, Connecticut
|align=left|
|-align=center
|Loss || 30-4 ||align=left| Demetrius Andrade
|UD || 10 || January 25, 2013 || align=left| Paramount Theatre, Huntington, New York
|align=left|
|-align=center
|Loss || 30-3 ||align=left| Erislandy Lara
|UD || 10  || June 30, 2012 || align=left| Fantasy Springs Resort Casino, Indio, California
|align=left|
|-align=center
|Win || 30-2 ||align=left| Luis Collazo
|UD|| 10 || October 15, 2011 || align=left| Staples Center, Los Angeles, California
|align=left|
|-align=center
|Loss || 29-2 ||align=left| Andre Berto
|TKO || 1 (12), (2:07) || November 27, 2010 || align=left| MGM Grand Arena, Las Vegas, Nevada
|align=left|
|-align=center
|Win || 29-1||align=left| Mike Anchondo
|TKO|| 4 (10), (1:38) || September 17, 2010 || align=left| Buffalo Bill's Star Arena, Primm, Nevada
|align=left|
|-align=center
|Win || 28-1 ||align=left| DeMarcus Corley
|KO || 5 (10), (1:48) || February 5, 2010 || align=left| Chumash Casino, Santa Ynez, California
|align=left|
|-align=center
|Win || 27-1 ||align=left| Octavio Narvaez
|UD || 8 || December 12, 2009 || align=left| Agua Caliente Casino, Rancho Mirage, California
|align=left|
|-align=center
|Win || 26-1 ||align=left| Damian Frias 
|UD || 10 || October 23, 2009 || align=left| Laredo Entertainment Center, Laredo, Texas
|align=left|
|-align=center
|Win || 25-1 || align=left| Hicklet Lau
|UD || 8 || July 31, 2009 || align=left| Pechanga Resort & Casino, Temecula, California
|align=left|
|-align=center
|Win || 24-1 || align=left| Norberto Bravo
|UD || 12 || April 18, 2008 || align=left| Casino Del Sol, Tucson, Arizona
|align=left|
|-align=center
|style="background: #DDDDDD"|NC || 23-1 || align=left| Roberto Garcia
|NC || 3 (12), (0:57) || November 30, 2007 || align=left| Jacob Brown Auditorium, Brownsville, Texas
|align=left|
|-align=center
|Win || 23-1 || align=left| Roberto Valenzuela
|TKO || 3 (10), (0:18) || August 31, 2007 || align=left| Casino Del Sol, Tucson, Arizona
|align=left|
|-align=center
|Win || 22-1 || align=left| Ben Tackie
|UD || 10 || June 1, 2007 || align=left| Cicero Stadium, Cicero, Illinois
|align=left|
|-align=center

References

External links

Freddy Hernandez - Profile, News Archive & Current Rankings at Box.Live

Boxers from Mexico City
Welterweight boxers
Light-middleweight boxers
1979 births
Living people
Mexican male boxers